Cressington railway station serves the Grassendale district of Liverpool, England.  It is situated on the Southport-Hunts Cross route of the Northern Line of the Merseyrail suburban system. The station takes its name from the Cressington Park area inside of Cressington.

History

The station, originally called Cressington & Grassendale, opened in 1864 as part of the Garston and Liverpool Railway line between Brunswick and Garston Dock. In 1865 the station and line were incorporated into the Cheshire Lines Committee.

The station closed in 1972 but reopened in 1978 as part of the Kirkby-Garston line of the Merseyrail system. Services were extended from Garston to Hunts Cross in 1983, and diverted to Southport instead of Kirkby in 1984.

From 11 December 2006 the Monday-Saturday evening service was increased to run every 15 minutes, instead of half-hourly as previously.

The station is recorded in the National Heritage List for England as a designated Grade II listed building, and has a traditional façade. As part of the Merseyrail upgrade, the platforms were lengthened to accommodate 6-car trains. This proved problematic, as the station is situated between two bridges in a narrow cutting. Special dispensation was given by the Railway Inspectorate to build the platforms narrower than the  width which would normally be required.

Facilities
The station is staffed, during all opening hours, and has platform CCTV. There is a payphone, booking office, waiting room and live departure and arrival screens for passenger information. The station has a free car park, with 17 spaces, as well as a 2-space cycle rack and secure storage for 14 cycles. There is no step-free access to platforms and the nearest station with disabled access is Liverpool South Parkway.

Services
Trains operate every 15 minutes, Monday-Saturday to Southport via Liverpool Central to the north, and Hunts Cross to the south. On Sundays, services are every 30 minutes in each direction.

Gallery

References

External links

 

Grade II listed buildings in Liverpool
Railway stations in Liverpool
DfT Category E stations
Grade II listed railway stations
Railway stations in Great Britain opened in 1864
Railway stations in Great Britain closed in 1972
Railway stations in Great Britain opened in 1978
Former Cheshire Lines Committee stations
Railway stations served by Merseyrail